"Moonlight popolare" is a song performed by Italian singer Mahmood and Massimo Pericolo. The song was released as a digital download on 14 May 2020 by Island Records. The song peaked at number three on the Italian Singles Chart.

Background
On his Instagram account, Mahmood said, "Since I was a child I have always had big dreams, with the certainty that some of these were too big for one in southern Milan. I was never afraid to tell what I saw from my bedroom window, but after all I understood that the moon can be looked at well even from a council house. I am overjoyed to have collaborated with Vane who I consider one of the best new rappers on the scene."

Music video
A music video to accompany the release of "Moonlight popolare" was first released onto YouTube on 22 May 2020.

Personnel
Credits adapted from Tidal.
 Crookers – producer
 Francesco Barbaglia – composer
 Alessandro Mahmoud – associated performer, author, vocals
 Massimo Pericolo – associated performer, vocals
 Alessandro Vanetti – author

Charts

References

2020 songs
2020 singles
Mahmood (singer) songs
Songs written by Mahmood